Tong (population 17,069 - 2001 UK census) is a ward within the City of Bradford Metropolitan District Council, West Yorkshire, England, named after Tong village which is its oldest settlement. The population at the 2011 Census was 20,608.

Geography
Although surrounded by Green Belt, most of the settlements nearest to Tong are urban in character, Tong Street being  to the west of the village, Drighlington  to the south, Gildersome,  to the south-east and New Farnley  to the east (distances from the boundaries of the ward). East Bierley, immediately adjacent in the south, is part of Kirklees.

History 
The ward was formed from the former civil parish of Tong which in the 19th century included the settlements of Dudley Hill, Tong Street, Westgate Hill, and Holme.

The Tong political ward includes the urban areas of Dudley Hill, and the council estates of Bierley, West Yorkshire, Holme Wood and Sutton which is part of Tyersal. These settlements stretch along the main thoroughfare, Tong Street, which is part of the A650 road. To the west of the ward is Woodlands which is part of Oakenshaw and to the very East of the ward is Tong Village on Tong Lane. Tong Village is a small, rural village surrounded by farmers' fields, and home to a historic local cricket club, Tong CC.

Coal and ironstone were mined in the area in the 19th and the early 20th centuries, and several mines are recorded.

The ward was a former Labour stronghold but in 2019, the Labour candidate tied with the Green Party candidate Matt Edwards. In 2021, Matt became the first non-Labour Party councillor in the ward since it was created, with 47% of the vote.

Governance 
Councillors
Tong is represented on Bradford Council by two Green councillors; Matt Edwards,  Celia Hickson and Kausar Mukhtar 

 indicates seat up for re-election.

See also
Listed buildings in Bradford (Tong Ward)

References

External links 

 Council ward profile (PDF)
 .

Wards of Bradford